Isabella may refer to:

People and fictional characters 
 Isabella (given name), including a list of people and fictional characters
 Isabella (surname), including a list of people

Places

United States 
 Isabella, Alabama, an unincorporated community
 Isabella, California, a former settlement
 Lake Isabella, California, a man-made reservoir
 Isabella, Georgia, an unincorporated community
 Isabella County, Michigan
 Isabella, an unincorporated community in Isabella Township, Michigan
 Isabella, Minnesota, an unincorporated community
 Isabella, Missouri, an unincorporated community
 Isabella River (Minnesota)
 Isabella, Oklahoma, a census-designated place and unincorporated community
 Isabella, Pennsylvania (disambiguation)
 Isabella Furnace, a cold-blast charcoal iron furnace, Pennsylvania

Elsewhere 
 Isabella River (New South Wales), Australia
 Isabella Island, Tasmania, Australia
 Isabela Island (Galápagos)
 Isabella, Manitoba, Canada, a settlement
 Isabella Lake (Alberta), Canada
 Isabella, Estonia, a village
 Isabella Plantation, an ornamental area in Richmond Park in London, United Kingdom
 Isabella (crater), on Venus
 210 Isabella, an asteroid

Arts and entertainment 
 Isabella (painting), a 1906 painting by Simon Maris
 Isabella (Millais painting), an 1849 painting by John Everett Millais, also known as Lorenzo and Isabella
 Isabella, or the Pot of Basil, an 1818 narrative poem by John Keats adapted from a story in Boccaccio's Decameron
 Isabella (novel), by Finnish author Kaari Utrio
 "Isabella" (The Sopranos), the twelfth episode of the TV show
 Isabella, Duchess of the Devils, a 1969 film from Italy/West-Germany
 Isabella (1988 film), a 1988 film from India
 Isabella (2006 film), a 2006 film from Hong Kong
 Isabella (album), a 2002 album by German Schlager group Die Flippers

Species 
 Agathodes isabella, a moth species
 , a bug species
 Antispila isabella, a moth species
 , a spider species
 Cancilla isabella, a sea snail species
 Chesias isabella, a moth species
 Damias isabella, a moth species
 Eois isabella, a moth species
 Eschata isabella, a moth species
 Funisciurus isabella or Lady Burton's rope squirrel, a rodent species
 Inquisitor isabella, a sea snail species
 Luria isabella, a sea snail species
 Platygraphis isabella, the only species in the moth genus Platygraphis
 Pyrrharctia isabella, a moth species
 Stiltia isabella or Australian pratincole, a bird species
 Strioterebrum isabella, a sea snail species

Transportation 
 Isabella (ship), various ships
 Borgward Isabella, an automobile manufactured by Carl F. W. Borgward GmbH from 1954 to 1962
 Isabella station, a former station on the Chicago Transit Authority's Evanston Line

Other uses 
 Isabella (grape), an American hybrid grape variety
 Isabella High School, Isabella, Alabama, United States
 Isabella piercing, a female genital piercing
 Isabella quarter, an American commemorative coin struck in 1893
 Isabelline (colour) or Isabella, a greyish-yellow or light buff colour
 Operation Isabella, a German World War II plan that was never implemented

See also 
 Isabel (disambiguation)
 Isabela (disambiguation)
 Isabelle (disambiguation)
 Isabella River (disambiguation)